The Pittsfield phylactery is a missing phylactery with a  black leather strap claimed to have been discovered by Joseph Merrick. It contained Hebrew writing, and later was lost.

"In June 1815, a boy employed by Merrick 'to clear the yard between the house and the wood house' found a black leather strap among the debris left by plowing. According to Josiah Priest, who took the account from the Reverend Mr. Ethan Smith, author of "View of the Hebrews," Merrick tossed the object in a box and forgot about it for several days until his curiosity got the better of him. When Merrick cut the strap open, he found that the box contained several tightly scrolled pieces of parchment inscribed with Hebrew characters."

At one time some believed the artifact was evidence of a relationship between the Lost Tribes of Israel and Native Americans. Lee M. Friedman wrote about it in 1917 but found no conclusive evidence support that theory. The other theory is it was dropped by a prisoner during the War of 1812.

Discussion of the artifact was part of a 2011 historical reenactment in the area.

References 

Armwear
Archaeology
Jewish ritual objects
Leather clothing
Religious headgear